Betty Sugrue is a former camogie player, captain of the All Ireland Camogie Championship winning team in 1971. She won All Ireland senior medals in Cork's four in a row of 1970–73.

References

External links
 Camogie.ie Official Camogie Association Website

Cork camogie players
Living people
Year of birth missing (living people)